Stacie Randall (born January 5, 1962) is an American actress, best known for her roles in Puppet Master 4, Trancers 4 and Trancers 5, and Excessive Force II: Force on Force. She is currently married to Jack Allocco.

Filmography

References

External links

20th-century American actresses
21st-century American actresses
American film actresses
American television actresses
American voice actresses
Living people
Place of birth missing (living people)
1962 births